is a district located in Saitama Prefecture, Japan.

As of July 1, 2011, the district has an estimated population of 77,583 and a population density of 1,680 persons per km2. The total area is 46.22 km2.

There are two towns in the district.
Matsubushi
Sugito

The following cities were once part of the district, but have since merged into other towns:
Parts of Kasukabe
Kuki
Misato
Satte
Yoshikawa

History
April 1, 1964: The village of Shōwa gained town status.
October 1, 1964: The village of Misato gained town status.
April 1, 1969: The village of Matsubushi gained town status.
May 3, 1972: The town of Misato gained city status.
October 1, 1986: The town of Satte gained city status.
April 1, 1996: The town of Yoshikawa gained city status.
October 1, 2005: The town of Shōwa merged with the city of Kasukabe to form the new city of Kasukabe.
March 23, 2010: The towns of Kurihashi and Washimiya, along with the town of Shōbu, from Minamisaitama District, merged with the city of Kuki to form the new city of Kuki.

References

Districts in Saitama Prefecture